Jon Switalski is a former Democratic politician from the U.S. state of Michigan. He was a member of the Michigan State House of Representatives, representing the 25th District which covers parts of Warren and Sterling Heights.

Switalski was elected to his second term in the State House in 2010. He had previously served two terms as the Macomb County Commissioner and worked as an aide to former U.S. Congressman David Bonior and was an advocate for health workers for the Service Employees International Union. Switalski is currently the Director of External Affairs for River LA, a nonprofit working on the revitalization of the Los Angeles River.

Education
Switalski is a graduate of St. Clement Catholic High School and also earned a bachelor's degree in political science from Grand Valley State University.

References

External links
Jon Switalkski for State Representative

People from Warren, Michigan
County commissioners in Michigan
Grand Valley State University alumni
Democratic Party members of the Michigan House of Representatives
Living people
Year of birth missing (living people)